The 2004 Superbike World Championship was the seventeenth FIM Superbike World Championship season. The season started on 29 February at Valencia and finished on 3 October at Magny-Cours after 11 rounds. The traditional Japanese round at Sugo was replaced with a new Canadian round which was scheduled for 4 July at the Mont-Tremblant, near Quebec. Though no explanation was given for the change, it was seen as some form of revenge after the refusal of the Japanese manufacturers to back the 2004 rules. The Canadian round was eventually canceled after a circuit inspection determined that the amount of work necessary to bring the venue up to WSBK standard could not be carried out in time for the proposed date.

2004 was the first season all bikes had to use control tyres, provided by Pirelli. Partly because of the control tyre rule, no factory bikes were entered by Japanese manufacturers.

James Toseland won the riders' championship and Ducati won the manufacturers' championship.

Race calendar and results

Championship standings

Riders' standings

Manufacturers' standings

Entry list

 All entries used Pirelli tyres.

References

Superbike World Championship seasons
World